The Sundance Festival of the Chamber Arts was a cultural summer festival that took place for several years during the 1960s in Upper Black Eddy in Bucks County, Pennsylvania. It was the brainchild of the noted harpsichord builder/entrepreneur Wolfgang Zuckermann.

History

Zuckermann's successful career as a seller of build-it-yourself harpsichord kits had been facilitated by a surge of public interest in music of the Baroque and classical periods. The festival was founded in 1963 by Zuckermann together with his colleague Eric Britton in response to this surge, as well as to rising interest in chamber music and related art forms.

The two built a charming open-air amphitheater, seating 250 people. The amphitheater was originally designed by Zuckermann himself and redesigned and built in partnership with local contractors. It was located on a 55-acre estate in the rural town of Upper Black Eddy, Northern Bucks County, Pennsylvania, a bit more than one hour from New York City (where Zuckermann ran his business in Greenwich Village) and rather less from Philadelphia. The rural surroundings added to the appeal of the enterprise, as Michael Townsend Smith (who succeeded Britton as director in 1966) later wrote:

It was extremely charming, and we presented a wondrous range of artists over the next three summers. Farther up the drive beyond the theatre, there were two houses, a barn, a tennis court, a big concrete swimming down in the woods, and a screened-in summer house. ... The performers often came for the weekend and enjoyed the facilities.

Zuckermann served as Managing Director, Eric Britton as Associate Director (1963-1965, followed by Smith). The festival featured chamber music, other musical artists (including, not surprisingly, various eminent harpsichordists), and some off-the-beaten path offering such as marionette opera.

The festival took place in the months of July and August. There were two performances weekly, Friday and Saturday nights, solely dedicated to chamber music, modern dance, drama, poetry readings, and film. Admission was $2.00 per concert.

The chamber music events were entirely devoted to classical music and featured some of the most appreciated groups of the time (Galimir String Quartet, the Kroll Quartet, the Claremont Quartet, Krainis Baroque Trio), harpsichordists (including Fernando Valenti, Sylvia Marlowe, Pamela Cook, Robert Conant), and distinguished musicians and singers (Helen Boatwright, Sanford Allen, Peter Serkin, Michael Tree, Rey de la Torre, Daniel Weisman, Suzanne Bloch among them).

An edge to the festival was given by less familiar, at times more experiment works, such as the dance presentations of the James Waring Company, Merce Cunningham (and John Cage), and Yvonne Rainer, among them. Sundance also presented off-off Broadway plays, marionette operas, poetry readings Allen Ginsburg and low budget films of what was then called the Independent American Cinema.

The last performances at Sundance took place in Summer 1968. In 1969, Zuckermann moved to England, selling both his harpsichord business as well as the Sundance property, and the Sundance Festival came to an end.

Reception
One enthusiastic patron wrote at the time: "Sundance is the newest and brightest star in the Bucks County firmament. The setting is a charming sylvan one, deep in a wooded area. The comfortable seating is, in true theater fashion so that one has an obstructed view from every point. The stage is handsome having a proscenium on which the names of the geniuses of the past and present are carved in gold on a dark brown with background. But the most interesting aspect before one enters the open air seating area and views the stage is that of the Mexican Indian like stucco wall, which forms the background of the theater, and seems to convey the idea of an abstract painting. And there is peace and beauty here – and excitement."

Programming

1963

 Yvonne Rainer
 Sylvia Marlowe
 Frank Paris Marionette Opera. Wolfgang Amadeus Mozart's Bastien und Bastienne. Joseph Haydn's Philemon und Baucis.
 Galimir String Quartet ??
 Kroll String Quartet ??
 New American Cinema ??
 Fernando Valenti 
 Tina Brown
 Judson Dance Theater
 Claremont Quartet
 Pamela Cook
 Robert Conant
 Helen Boatwright
 Sanford Allen
 Daniel Weisman
 Suzanne Bloch

1964 

 Peter Serkin and Michael Tree
 Lucinda Childs
 Judson Dance Theater
 Kroll String Quartet ?
 Gallimard Quartet
 New American Cinema ??

1965

 
 The Brass Arts Quartet
 Rey de la Torre, Classical guitar
 Curtis String Quartet.
 Albert Fuller, harpsichord.
 Robert Koff, violin, and Louis Bagger, harpsichord.
 Joseph Marx Baroque Ensemble.
 John Cage, piano. David Tudor, piano
 Merce Cunningham and Dance Company

1966

 Judson Chamber Ensemble.(2 concerts)
 Beverly Smith/Roberts Blossoms – Filmstages
 The Open Theater – "Viet rock"
 The Festival Winds
 Judson Poets Theater 
 Claremont String Quartet (3 concerts)
 New American Cinema.
 La MaMa Repertory. – Chicago
 Allen Ginsberg/Peter Ganesh Orlovsky – Poems
 New York Chamber Soloists.
 Katherine Litz and Aileen Passloff/Remy Charlip
 Paul Jacobs, harpsichord.
 Al Carmines – theater songs 
 Joseph Marx Baroque Ensemble
 La Monte Young – Experiments
 Cecil Taylor Trio
 Manhattan Festival Ballet

For additional information:

1967
 July 19: Fernando Valenti, harpsichord, in a recital of Spanish Baroque music including works by Scarlatti and Soler
 July 20: Robert Schwartz: X-ing, a multiform dance work—assemblages, moments, improvisations—performed by the choreographer with Delila Zuck and others
 July 26: Opera Bluestocking: "In a Garden", by Meyer Kupferman and Gertrude Stein; "The Secular Mask" by William Boyce; and "The Fortress of Ares" by Bela Bartok
 July 27: Princeton String Quartet: Haydn's "Seven Last Words of Christ", in mourning for all the victims of the war in Vietnam
 August 2: James Oliver Buswell IV, violin, and Fernando Valenti, harpsichord, in a program of sonatas by Bach
 August 3: "The Hawk", by Murray Mednick and Tony Barsha, a radical experiment in improvisational ritual theatre, with the original off-off-Broadway cast
 August 4: Student recital: works for one, two, and three harpsichords, performance by advanced students of Fernando Valenti's Sundance master classes
 August 9: New York Chamber Soloists: piano quartets and piano trios by Haydn, Mozart, and Schumann
 August 10: New York Chamber Soloists: all-contemporary program including the Harpsichord Concerto by Manuel de Falla and the Sonata for Flute, Oboe, Cello, and Harpsichord by Elliott Carter
 August 16: The Gift Rite: Ken Dewey Action Theatre in a jazz/medieval collision with the myth of fire—a happening
 August 17–18: New American Cinema
 August 25–56: "Poppy Nogood" by Terry Riley, "Medicine Dance" by Trisha Brown, "Shirt" by R. Whitman, Ravi Shankar

1968
July 19: Fernando Valenti, harpsichord, in a recital of Spanish Baroque music including works by Scarlatti and Soler
July 20: Robert Schwartz: X-ing, a multiform dance work—assemblages, moments, improvisations—performed by the choreographer with Delila Zuck and others
July 26: Opera Bluestocking: "In a Garden", by Meyer Kupferman and Gertrude Stein; "The Secular Mask" by William Boyce; and "The Fortress of Ares" by Bela Bartok
July 27: Princeton String Quartet: Haydn's "Seven Last Words of Christ", in mourning for all the victims of the war in Vietnam
August 2: James Oliver Buswell IV, violin, and Fernando Valenti, harpsichord, in a program of sonatas by Bach
August 3: "The Hawk", by Murray Mednick and Tony Barsha, a radical experiment in improvisational ritual theatre, with the original off-off-Broadway cast
August 4: Student recital: works for one, two, and three harpsichords, performance by advanced students of Fernando Valenti's Sundance master classes
August 9: New York Chamber Soloists: piano quartets and piano trios by Haydn, Mozart, and Schumann
August 10: New York Chamber Soloists: all-contemporary program including the Harpsichord Concerto by Manuel de Falla and the Sonata for Flute, Oboe, Cello, and Harpsichord by Elliott Carter
August 16: The Gift Rite: Ken Dewey Action Theatre in a jazz/medieval collision with the myth of fire—a happening
August 17–18: New American Cinema

Commentaries
From Michael Townsend Smith:

From Eric Britton, Paris:

Notes

References
"Sundance arts fete to open in Bucks County, July 26". The New York Times, July 3, 1963.

Chamber music festivals
Classical music festivals in the United States
Dance festivals in the United States
Theatre festivals in the United States
Film festivals in Pennsylvania
Film festivals established in 1963
Recurring events disestablished in 1967
1963 establishments in Pennsylvania
1967 disestablishments in Pennsylvania
Bucks County, Pennsylvania